Efzar (formerly, Marand (Persian: مرند), also known as Marand Ābādeh) is a city and capital of Efzar District, in Qir and Karzin County, Fars Province, Iran.  At the 2006 census, its population was 2,243, in 470 families.

References

Populated places in Qir and Karzin County

Cities in Fars Province